The first fixture between Manchester United and West Bromwich Albion in the 1978–79 Football League First Division season was played on 30 December 1978 at Old Trafford, Manchester. The scores were level at 3–3 at half-time, before West Brom scored twice in the second half to win the match 5–3. As winners, they received two league points in the 1978–79 Football League First Division.

The game was described at the time as "Game of the Century" and is still regarded as one of the greatest games of English football. The West Brom team featured three Black British players – Cyrille Regis, Laurie Cunningham and Brendon Batson; nicknamed "The Three Degrees" after the African-American vocal group, they blazed a trail for black footballers in England and were frequently the subject of racist abuse, including "audible boos" from Manchester United fans in this game.

Background

Before the game commenced, West Bromwich Albion were at the top of the First Division, while Manchester United were in 10th place. West Brom were on a roll, having won games in December 1978 against Valencia (2–0, in the UEFA Cup), Middlesbrough (2–0), Wolverhampton Wanderers (3–0) and Arsenal (2–1). United, on the other hand, were coming off consecutive 3–0 defeats against Bolton Wanderers and Liverpool and had dropped several positions in the table.
 
The game was televised with extended highlights on Granada Television with commentary by Gerald Sinstadt.

Match

Details

Legacy
The league season ended in May 1979 with West Brom finishing third and United ninth.

Len Cantello's volleyed goal was voted Goal of the Season for 1978–79 on ATV's Star Soccer show.

In May 2013, former players (Tony Brown, John Wile, Cyrille Regis, Brendan Batson and manager Ron Atkinson from West Bromwich Albion; Gordon McQueen and Martin Buchan from Manchester United) reunited at The Hawthorns (West Brom's home ground) to commemorate the famous match, as part of the Celebration Statue 1979, culminating on 15 July 2014 with the unveiling of a sculpture of Albion's iconic trio Cyrille Regis, Laurie Cunningham and Brendon Batson. Batson described the 5–3 win as "a seminal game [for black players] in many respects because of how well we played."

In The Guardian in 2013, Scott Murray described the game as the "signature performance" of Cunningham and of that great West Brom team.

Nick Constable, in Match of the Day: 50 Years of Football (2014), described it as one of the greatest games ever, saying "Cunningham on the ball was the enduring memory of the game – shrugging off pathetic racist boos with a performance that oozed class, grace and pace. If ever a winger was art in human form, it was Cunningham that night."

See also
1978–79 Manchester United F.C. season
1978–79 West Bromwich Albion F.C. season
Len Cantello Testimonial Match

References

External links

1978–79 Football League
Football League First Division matches
West Bromwich Albion 1978
Manchester United 1978
December 1978 sports events in the United Kingdom
1970s in Manchester